Siro may refer to:
Siro (name)
 Syrus of Genoa, saint
 Syrus of Pavia, saint
 Siro (harvestman), a genus of harvestmen in the family Sironidae

See also
 Siros, Pyrénées-Atlantiques
 Syros
 Saint Syrus (disambiguation)
 San Siro (disambiguation)